

Main Harbour

Zealand Side

Amager

See also
 Template:Bridges in Copenhagen

References

 List of Bridges in Copenhagen
Bridges
Copenhagen